"Air" is a song by the Norwegian duo  Marcus & Martinus, released as a single on 25 February 2023. It was performed in Melodifestivalen 2023.

Charts

References

2023 songs
2023 singles
Marcus & Martinus songs
Melodifestivalen songs of 2023